The Liga Femenina Profesional de Fútbol Colombiano (Colombian Professional Women's Football League) or Liga Femenina BetPlay DIMAYOR (sponsored name) is the top level women's football league in Colombia. The first season was held in 2017, with 18 teams taking part. The champion qualifies to the Copa Libertadores Femenina.

History
Colombia women's football had only regional leagues until 2016. The entrant to the Copa Libertadores Femenina was decided in a tournament called Copa Pre-Libertadores, in which non-professional clubs took part. The winning team in all editions was Formas Íntimas. In 2016 a tournament called Campeonato Nacional Interclubes was held, organized by the División Aficionada del Fútbol Colombiano (Difútbol). About 40 teams played in four stages for the championship. Generaciones Palmiranas won the final 6–5 on aggregate over Molino Viejo and qualified to the 2016 Copa Libertadores Femenina.

With the approval of Dimayor, the first professional women's football league was organized and played starting from 2017, with 18 out of Dimayor's 36 affiliate clubs, which were split into 3 groups of 6. It was planned to create a second level league to which new clubs would have entered starting from 2018, but this did not happen. A national women's league is a requirement to host the FIFA Women's World Cup, in which Colombia showed interest for the 2023 edition.

In spite of being a league in consolidation, the tournament is of a short type that takes place over a period of four or five months, however it has the largest number of teams in competition if you consider the existing professional leagues such as; Liga MX Femenil (18 teams), Primera División (women) (16 teams), D1F (12 teams), Frauen-Bundesliga (12 teams), Damallsvenskan (12 teams), FA WSL (11 teams),  Nadeshiko League (12 teams), NWSL (9 teams), CWSL (8 teams), Nationalliga A (women's football) (8 teams).
In addition, in the league of 2018, 487 players participated in the 23 teams, of which 81 were foreigners from 12 nationalities, where the largest group was the Venezuelan with 52 players.

Format
In 2017 the 18 teams were divided into three groups of six. After playing each other twice, the top two in each group and the best two third-placed teams advanced to the quarter-finals, with the winners going on to play the semi-finals and finals. All matches in the knockout stages were played as double-legged series. The tournament lasted five months between February and June.

In 2018 the 23 teams were divided into three groups of six and one group of five. After playing each other twice, the top two in each group advanced to the quarter-finals, with the winners going on to play the semi-finals and finals. All matches in the knockout stages were played as double-legged series. The tournament lasted four months between February and May.

2023 teams
Notably absent from the list of clubs is Formas Íntimas, who joined an alliance with Envigado from 2017 to 2018, with Independiente Medellín from 2019 to 2022, and with Atlético Nacional from 2023 onwards since participation in the league is restricted to professional clubs (DIMAYOR affiliates) only. In the 2023 season, the league will have 17 clubs participating:

América de Cali
Atlético Bucaramanga
Atlético Huila
Atlético Nacional
Boyacá Chicó
Cortuluá (in association with Águilas Doradas)
Deportes Tolima
Deportivo Cali
Deportivo Pasto
Deportivo Pereira
Independiente Medellín
Junior
La Equidad
Llaneros
Millonarios
Real Santander
Santa Fe

List of finals

Titles by club

See also 
 Football in Colombia

References

External links 
 DIMAYOR
 Colombian Football Federation

 
Colombia
Colombia
Sports leagues established in 2017
Women's football in Colombia
2017 establishments in Colombia